Khomar Baghi (also Romanized as Khomār Bāghī; also known as Khasār Bāghī, Khomār Bāqi, and Khomār Bāqī) is a village in Esfandan Rural District, in the Central District of Komijan County, Markazi Province, Iran. At the 2006 census, its population was 872, in 215 families.

References 

Populated places in Komijan County